Panthiwa Phumiprathet (also known as Tom Dundee, ; born 20 May 1958) is a Thai phleng phuea chiwit singer and actor. He is popular in 1993 with his first studio album This is must kick you with knee (อย่างนี้ต้องตีเข่า).

Early life and career
He was born in Phetchaburi Province. He finished his education in France, where he became close friends with family of the former prime minister of Thailand, Pridi Banomyong. After he finished his education, he started on stage in 1983 as a member of ZuZu which Thai famous Phleng phuea chiwit music band. He is a lead vocal of ZuZu with Raphin Bhuddhichart, and he have song which vocal for ZuZu include "Broken" (Yab Yearn, ยับเยิน), "The Chiang Mai Umbrella woman" (Bor Sang Klang Jong, บ่อสร้างกางจ้อง), "The Mayura" (มยุรา), etc. And he resign from ZuZu after he join to protest in 1992 Black May. After that, he started to solo singer with his first studio album, This is must kick you with knee (อย่างนี้ต้องตีเข่า).

Political career
He supported to United Front for Democracy Against Dictatorship and he appeared on the stage and had speeches on multiple occasions. He was jailed for Lèse-majesté in 2016, and was freed in 2020. after which he returned to entertainment.

Discography
With ZuZu
 Roads to new Hope (สู่ความหวังใหม่, 1989)
 Where is the coral? (ปะการังไปไหน, 1990)
 The salt farmer (คนเค็มเลคาว, 1991)
 The King of Cha, cha, cha (ราชาสามช่า, 1992; This song tribute to Aed Carabao)As solo singer'''
 This is must kick you with knee (อย่างนี้ต้องตีเข่า, 1993)
 Refreshed (มันเขี้ยว, 1994)
 Tom Thai rhythm (ทอม..จังหวะไทย, 1995)
 The bravely medal'' (เหรียญกล้าหาญ, 1995)

References

1958 births
Living people
20th-century Thai male singers
21st-century Thai male singers
United Front for Democracy Against Dictatorship activists
People accused of lèse majesté in Thailand
Thai democracy activists
People from Phetchaburi province